Christine Juliane of Baden-Durlach (12 September 1678 – 10 July 1707), was a German noblewoman of the House of Zähringen and by marriage Duchess of Saxe-Eisenach.

Early life
Born at Karlsburg Castle in Karlsruhe, Durlach, she was the oldest of the four children of Prince Charles Gustav of Baden-Durlach (younger brother of Frederick VII, Margrave of Baden-Durlach) and his wife, Princess Anna Sophia of Brunswick-Wolfenbüttel.

Biography
The only surviving child of her parents (her three younger brothers all died in infancy), in Wolfenbüttel on 27 February 1697 she married Prince John William of Saxe-Eisenach (younger brother of Duke John George II) as his second wife. One year later (10 November 1698), her husband inherited the Duchy of Saxe-Eisenach after his brother's death without issue. 

During her marriage, Christine Juliane gave birth seven children, of whom only three survived to adulthood:

Johannetta Antoinette Juliane (Jena, 31 January 1698 - Schloss Dahme, 13 April 1726), married on 9 May 1721 to Prince Johann Adolf of Saxe-Weissenfels (who in 1734 inherited the Duchy from his childless brother).
Caroline Christine (Jena, 15 April 1699 - Philippsthal, 25 July 1743), married on 24 November 1725 to Charles I, Landgrave of Hesse-Philippsthal.
Anton Gustav (Eisenach, 12 August 1700 - Eisenach, 4 October 1710).
Charlotte Wilhelmine Juliane (Eisenach, 27 June 1703 - Erfurt, 17 August 1774), unmarried.
Johannetta Wilhelmine Juliane (Eisenach, 10 September 1704 - Eisenach, 3 January 1705).
Charles William (Eisenach, 9 January 1706 - Eisenach, 24 February 1706).
Charles August (Eisenach, 10 June 1707 - Eisenach, 22 February 1711).

One month after her last childbirth, Christine Juliane died in Eisenach, aged 28. She was buried in the Georgenkirche, Eisenach.

References

|-

House of Zähringen
House of Wettin
1678 births
1707 deaths
18th-century German people
Duchesses of Saxe-Eisenach
Deaths in childbirth